Rocket to the Moon is a 1938 play by the American playwright Clifford Odets. Originally produced by the Group Theatre at Broadway's Belasco Theatre, directed by Harold Clurman, starring Morris Carnovsky, Luther Adler and Eleanor Lynn.

Plot
In 1938 New York City, a dentist finds his business and marriage failing as he embarks on a love affair with a young dental assistant.

Original Broadway cast

 Luther Adler as Mr. Prince
 Morris Carnovsky as Ben Stark, D.D.S.
 William Challee as a Salesman
 Leif Erickson as Frenchy
 Sanford Meisner as Willy Wax
 Ruth Nelson as Belle Stark
 Art Smith as Phil Cooper, D.D.S.
 Eleanor Lynn as Cleo Singer

Adaptations
The play was adapted for television by the BBC in 1986, with John Malkovich, Judy Davis, Eli Wallach, William Hootkins, Ian McShane and Connie Booth in the lead roles.

References

External links
 
 

Plays by Clifford Odets
1938 plays
Plays set in New York City
Works about dentistry